Vasanthi is a Malayalam-language drama film written, edited and directed by Rahman brothers, Shinos & Sajas for producer, actor Siju Wilson. The film won the 2020 Kerala State Film Award for Best Film before releasing. The film premiered at the 2021 International Film Festival of Kerala.

Summary
It is a journey that traverses through stage plays, story telling and a host of male domains in Vasanthi's life.

Cast
Swasika
Siju Wilson
Shabareesh Varma

Awards 
50th Kerala State Film Awards 2020
 Kerala State Film Award for Best Film
 Kerala State Film Award for Best Screenplay
 Kerala State Film Award for Best Character Actress - Swasika

References

External links
 

2021 films
Films about social issues in India
2020s Malayalam-language films
Films scored by Rajesh Murugesan